Six Flags Hurricane Harbor is a water park located at Six Flags Darien Lake in Darien, New York. Opened in 1990 as Barracuda Bay, the water park is included with the price of admission to the amusement park, and both are operated by Six Flags. The park was known as Splashtown at Darien Lake from 2010 through the 2021 season.

History
When the water park first opened as Barracuda Bay, it encompassed areas formerly included in the main park. In 2010, Darien Lake rebranded the water park to Splashtown at Darien Lake, it included a separate admission along with a new slide complex and lazy river. Splashtown reverted their separate admission price to include the water park with the theme park's admission.

On August 29, 2019, Six Flags Darien Lake announced that Splashtown will be rebranded as Six Flags Hurricane Harbor for the 2020 season, along with an expansion with the water park. Due to the growing concerns of the COVID-19 pandemic, Six Flags announced a suspension of operations across the company on March 13, 2020.

Current attractions

Former attractions

Gallery

References

External links

Six Flags Darien Lake official website

Six Flags Darien Lake
Six Flags water parks
Buildings and structures in Genesee County, New York
1990 establishments in New York (state)
Tourist attractions in Genesee County, New York
Water parks in New York (state)

fr:Darien Lake Theme Park Resort